Lingayapalem is a neighbourhood and a part of Urban Notified Area of Amaravati, the state capital of the Indian state of Andhra Pradesh. It was a village in Thullur mandal of in Guntur district, prior to its denotification as gram panchayat.

Demographics 

The average literacy rate stands at 56.75 percent, with  literates.

Transport 
Lingayapalem is located on the Vijayawada and Amaravathi routes. APSRTC run buses provide transport services from Vijayawada to Lingayapalem.

References 

Neighbourhoods in Amaravati